St Joseph's Nudgee College (commonly referred to simply as Nudgee or Nudgee College) is an independent Catholic primary and secondary day and boarding school for boys, located in Boondall, a northern suburb of Brisbane, Queensland, Australia.

The school was founded by the Congregation of Christian Brothers in 1891 as a result of the large numbers of boarders at St. Joseph's College, Gregory Terrace, also operated by the Christian Brothers, and insufficient room to house the boarders. Both schools share St. Joseph's College as part of their name and follow the Edmund Rice tradition, administered via Edmund Rice Education Australia. Nudgee currently caters for approximately 1,600 students from Year 5 to Year 12, including 300 boarders.

In 2006, some of the buildings of the school were listed in the Queensland Heritage Register.

St Joseph's is affiliated with the Australian Boarding Schools Association (ABSA), the Association of Heads of Independent Schools of Australia (AHISA), the Junior School Heads Association of Australia (JSHAA), and is a founding member of the Great Public Schools Association of Queensland (GPS).

History 

The college was established in 1891, as the boarding campus for St Joseph's College, Gregory Terrace. Its location was selected by Brother Patrick Ambrose Treacy, founder of the Australian Province of the Christian Brothers, at the request of the Archbishop of Brisbane at the time, Robert Dunne. Brother D. F. Bodkin was appointed first Headmaster.

At the time of Nudgee College's Golden Jubilee in 1941, the late Archbishop Sir James Duhig described the college as being "the jewel in the crown of the Christian Brothers' Schools in Queensland".

School buildings 

The main building was completed in 1891; the architect was Andrea Stombuco. The façade of this building was used in the movie Phar Lap. The matching chapel was completed in 1916 and is used for weddings and funerals in addition to school celebrations. In 1993, after refurbishment, it won Royal Australian Institute of Architects Conservation Award and Regional Commendation. A second school building was completed in 1919. All three buildings were completed in the Italian Renaissance style.

In 1938, Nudgee Junior College was opened at a separate campus in Indooroopilly. In 2015, it was renamed Ambrose Treacy College.

Building has continued at Boondall, and the campus now has sporting and academic facilities including technologically advanced classrooms throughout the school, an award-winning multi-level learning centre, science laboratories, a vocational education centre, a 400-seat auditorium, 13 playing fields for cricket, rugby and football, 12 tennis courts, indoor and outdoor basketball and volleyball courts, a multi-purpose gymnasium, an Olympic grade athletics track, a weights room, Olympic 50-metre and 25-metre heated swimming pools, a sound-proofed, digital recording studio, art workshops, and cattle yards.

Other significant developments 
In July 1967, a 17-year-old student of the college, John Frances Treacy, was murdered outside the chapel by a 29-year-old man, John Martin Heywood. Heywood had befriended Treacy while in hospital in August 1966. Heywood, who had a long criminal history, was convicted of the murder, and spent the remainder of his life in prison or in mental hospitals.

The college was unable to locate any records of the man attending the school and denied any wrongdoing.

Battle of the Colours 
In 1991, the following was printed in the Centennial Rugby Program, dubbed - "The Battle of The Colours", for the 100th anniversary of the annual Nudgee vs Terrace rugby match:

The result of the Centennial Nudgee vs Terrace rugby match was a 15-all draw.

Academic 
Nudgee College's teaching and learning ethos aligns with Art Costa's Habits of Mind framework.

In addition to a wide range of subject offerings, Nudgee offers students access to learning support, an enrichment and extension program and a vocational education and training program. The school is also a pioneer in the field of flipped learning.

Co-curricular 
As a member school of the GPS Association, Nudgee students are able to take part in cricket, rowing, volleyball, debating, swimming, football, tennis, cross country (athletics), rugby, basketball, chess, and track and field (athletics). The school also offers students access to an extensive music program, Theatresports, a robotics and steam club, and a cattle club, Art Club.

The Season 
In 2017, Nudgee College was featured in series one of Onion TV's production of The Season. The series followed the school's first XV as they progressed through the 2017 GPS season, which ultimately ended with a tied Premiership with The Southport School. The Season aired on Fox Sports 3 in Australia and Sky Sports in New Zealand. The episodes are now available to watch on the school's Youtube channel.

Nudgee International College
While Nudgee International College sat within the grounds of St Joseph's Nudgee College at Boondall, Nudgee International College was a completely separate entity and was not part of St Joseph's Nudgee College. In early 2012 it was announced that the Nudgee International College would close. The site has ceased to function as a separate college since late 2012. The building and facilities tuned over to the St Joseph's Nudgee College and the site was repurposed by the school for planned redevelopment.

Notable alumni

Academia, medicine and science 
 Dr Prof John Boldemannuclear scientist, best known for his work on the ANTARES Tandem Accelerator and the Australian synchrotron 

 Francis Patrick Donovan 1946 Rhodes scholar
 Neal Macrossan1907 Rhodes scholar
 Dr Harry WindsorAustralia's first heart transplant surgeon

Arts, entertainment and music 
 Jacob Elordiactor
 Ron Grainercomposer
 Pete Murraysinger-songwriter

Business 
 Ian Riceproperty developer and former president of Carlton Blues

Politics, public service and the law
 Archbishop John BathersbyCatholic Archbishop of Brisbane
 Kevin Byrneformer Mayor of Cairns
 The Hon Hugh Denis MacrossanState MLA, 1912–1915 and Chief Justice of Queensland, 1940
 Neal MacrossanChief Justice of Queensland, 1946–1955
 The Hon John MuirJustice of Appeal, Supreme Court of Queensland (retired 27 December 2014) 
 Ted O'BrienMember for Fairfax

 Neil O'SullivanLeader of the Liberal Party in the Senate
 The Hon Warwick Parer Senator and Minister, 1984–2000
 Tom Quiltypastoralist, philanthropist, and bush poet

 Mick Veiversformer coalition government minister, and rugby league football player
 Terry Whiteformer Liberal Party leader in Queensland and founder of Terry White Chemists
Minister for Police and Corrective Services and Minister for Fire and Emergency Services
Mark Ryan MP

Sport
 Jason AkermanisAustralian rules football player

 Leith Brodieswimmer, bronze medallist at the 2008 Beijing Olympics
 Joe Burnscricket player

 Jamie CharmanAustralian rules football player
 Lionel Coxcyclist, gold and silver medallist at the 1952 Helsinki Olympic]
 Michael Cresswellbasketball player for Cairns Marlins
 Rocky Elsomrugby union football player
 Elton Flatleyrugby union football player
 Josh Flookrugby union football player
 Nicholas Halljockey
 Sean Hardmanrugby union football player
 Nathan Hauritzcricket player
 Peter Hewatrugby union football player

 Damian Istria gymnast, gold and silver medallist at the 2006 Commonwealth Games
 Mark Loanerugby union football player
 Chris Lynncricket player
 Paul McLeanrugby union football player
 Jack McLoughlin1500m Freestyle, 2016 Rio Olympics
 Sean McMahonrugby union football player
 Hugh McMenimanrugby union football player
 Nathan McSweeneycricket player
 Jimmy Mahercricket player
 Anthony Martinweightlifter, 2000 Olympic Games
 Harley Moore representative rower
 Matt Moorebasketball player for South East Melbourne Magic and Brisbane Bullets
 James O'Connorrugby union football player for the Australian Wallabies
 Brenton Rickardswimmer, silver medallist at the 2008 Beijing Olympics
 Dom Shipperleyrugby union football player
 Mitchell Swepsoncricket player

 Will Magnay Australian Nba/Nbl basketball player currently play’s for Tasmania jack jumpers
 Reesjan Pasitoa - Australian rugby union football player

See also

 Catholic education in Australia
 List of schools in Queensland
 List of boarding schools
 Great Public Schools Association of Queensland Inc.

References

External links

 St. Joseph's Nudgee College website
 St Joseph's College, Nudgee YouTube channel

 
1891 establishments in Australia